Engadine may refer to:

Places
Engadin(e), a valley region in Switzerland
Engadine, New South Wales, a suburb of Sydney, Australia
Engadine, Michigan, unincorporated community in Michigan
Engadine (Candler, North Carolina), a building listed on the National Register of Historic Places

Ships
, a passenger ferry
, a seaplane tender
, an aircraft transporter
RFA Engadine (K08), a helicopter support ship

Other
 Engadine sheep, a breed of sheep from Switzerland, also known as Red Engadine